Revival is the third studio album from the American metal band Light the Torch and also their first studio album since changing their name from Devil You Know.

The album sold around 5,000 copies in the United States in its first week of release.

Revival is the only album to feature the drummer Mike Sciulara.

Critical reception

The album has received positive reviews from some music critics.

Track listing

Personnel
Light the Torch
 Howard Jones – lead vocals
 Francesco Artusato – guitars, album artwork
 Ryan Wombacher – bass, backing vocals
 Mike Sciulara  – drums

Charts

References 

Devil You Know (band) albums